Omar Thabiti Gaither (born March 18, 1984) is a former American football linebacker of the National Football League (NFL). He was drafted by the Philadelphia Eagles in the fifth round of the 2006 NFL Draft. He has played for the Philadelphia Eagles, Carolina Panthers, Houston Texans, and Oakland Raiders. He played college football at Tennessee.

Early years 
Gaither played high school football at Myers Park High School.

College career 
Gaither played college football at the University of Tennessee from 2002 to 2005. He was a two-year starter at Tennessee, Gaither recorded 210 tackles with 6 sacks and 23 tackles for a loss. As a senior, finished with 78 tackles, 4 sacks, 7.5 tackles for a loss, and 4 forced fumbles en route to his second straight Second-team All-SEC. Had a career-high 92 tackles, including 12.5 tackles for a loss as a junior when he took over the strongside (or "Sam") linebacker duties.

Professional career

Philadelphia Eagles 
Gaither was drafted in the fifth round of the 2006 NFL Draft by the Philadelphia Eagles. Gaither received significant playing time later in the 2006 season due to the struggles and injury of starter Matt McCoy. Gaither got his first NFL start at weakside linebacker on December 4, 2006 on a Monday Night Football win against the Carolina Panthers. He became the starter at weakside linebacker for the final 7 games (post and regular season) and finished with 58 tackles, 1 sack, and 1 interception. Ranked second on the team in special teams tackles (30) and 4th in special teams production points (185).

Gaither was named the starter at middle linebacker in 2007 after the release of Jeremiah Trotter, and started all 16 games at middle linebacker and tallied team highs in tackles (170) and quarterback hurries (14). He also ranked second on the team with 14 KDs, intercepting one pass, defending seven passes, and forcing one fumble.

Prior to the start of 2008, Gaither was moved back to his true position of weakside linebacker to make move room for Stewart Bradley. Though not an indictment of Gaither's performance, Bradley took over the MLB spot largely in part to his phenomenal first start against the New Orleans Saints in week 16 of 2007 (a game in which Gaither played Weakside ("Will") Linebacker). Gaither was benched prior to the week 12 game at the Baltimore Ravens in favor of Akeem Jordan.

After starting middle linebacker Bradley suffered a torn ACL which caused him to be placed on injured reserve in 2009, Gaither beat out second-year linebacker Joe Mays for the starting position. Four weeks into the season, however, the Eagles re-signed Trotter to replace Gaither on first- and second-down plays. Gaither suffered a Lisfranc sprain during a game against the Oakland Raiders and was placed on injured reserve on October 28, 2009.

Gaither was re-signed to a one-year contract on March 31, 2010.

Carolina Panthers 
Gaither was signed by the Carolina Panthers on July 31, 2011, played in all four pre-season games and ten regular season games (started four), and was released on March 13, 2012.

Houston Texans 
The Houston Texans signed Gaither on August 9, 2012, but released him during final cuts.

Oakland Raiders 
The Oakland Raiders signed Gaither on November 14, 2012, to replace the injured Travis Goethel.

Gaither re-signed with the Raiders on July 29, 2013, but released him during final cuts.

Atlanta Falcons 
The Atlanta Falcons signed Gaither, along with fellow Eagles teammate Jamar Chaney, on September 17, 2013, to replace the injured Sean Weatherspoon.

References

External links 

Oakland Raiders bio
Carolina Panthers bio

1984 births
Living people
Players of American football from Charlotte, North Carolina
American football linebackers
Tennessee Volunteers football players
Philadelphia Eagles players
Carolina Panthers players
Houston Texans players
Oakland Raiders players
Atlanta Falcons players